Okharkot is a town and Village Development Committee in Pyuthan, a Middle Hills district of Rapti Zone, western Nepal.

Etymology

Okhar - walnut tree (Juglans regia). 
kot - guardroom, prison, police station.

Villages in this VDC

Machcchī is the VDC's administrative center at the confluence of Dharmawati River and Gartang Khola.  Okharkot village with its ancient fortress sits on a ridgetop 2 km. east and some 675 meters (2200 feet) higher.  It is listed in IUCN's inventory of historic sites.

References

External links
UN map of VDC boundaries, water features and roads in Pyuthan District

Populated places in Pyuthan District